The River Funshion is a river in Munster, Ireland, a tributary of the Munster Blackwater.

Course
The River Funshion rises in the Galtee Mountains at Kilbeheny, near the County Limerick–County Tipperary border. It flows southwards past Galtee Castle and under the M8, crossing the R639. It then flows westwards and forms part of the County Limerick–County Cork border, passing under the M8 again, and the R639 at  Kilbeheny. It flows westwards through Mitchelstown Golf Club, north of the town. The Funshion passes under the N73 near Kildorrery, flowing southeast through Glanworth and again under the M8 and R639, draining into the Munster Blackwater about 3.5 km (2 mi) downriver of Fermoy.

Wildlife

The River Funshion is a brown trout and salmon fishery.

See also

Rivers of Ireland

References

Rivers of County Cork
Rivers of County Limerick
Rivers of County Tipperary